Pittosporum crassifolium, commonly called karo, is a small tree or shrub native to New Zealand. Karo's original distribution was generally the top half of the North Island, although now it has naturalised throughout New Zealand and overseas in Norfolk Island, Hawaii and the Isles of Scilly. P. crassifolium occurs in lowland and coastal forests.

Karo has dense dark gray-green leathery leaves that are furry underneath. An early coloniser, P. crassifolium is able to withstand high winds and salt spray. Clusters of small red-purple flowers appear in spring, developing into seed pods that split to expose the sticky seeds.

Pittosporum crassifolium is considered to be "weeds in cultivation" in California, where they are being kept under observation to ensure they do not escape into the wild. In New Zealand birds easily spread karo seed and in areas south of its natural range it has become a pest plant.

References

External links

Jepson Manual Treatment
Photo gallery

crassifolium
Trees of New Zealand